Dave Randall and Greg Van Emburgh were the defending champions, but did not participate together this year.  Randall partnered Jean-Philippe Fleurian, losing in the first round.  Van Emburgh partnered Geoff Grant, losing in the first round.

Grant Stafford and Kevin Ullyett won in the final 7–5, 6–4, against Mark Merklein and Vincent Spadea.

Seeds

  Luke Jensen /  Murphy Jensen (first round)
  Michael Tebbutt /  Mikael Tillström (quarterfinals)
  Brandon Coupe /  Jack Waite (quarterfinals)
  Grant Stafford /  Kevin Ullyett (champions)

Draw

Draw

External links
Draw

Delray Beach Open
1998 ATP Tour